Cornelia Bradford may refer to:

Cornelia Foster Bradford (1847–1935), American philanthropist and social reformer
Cornelia Smith Bradford (d. 1755), American printer and newspaper editor